The American Ranch was a 160-acre farm and lodging house located in the American Valley, now Quincy, California.

The American Ranch and Hotel was founded in 1852 by H.J. Bradley. The structure has the distinction of being the first in the area constructed of sawn lumber. It served as the county seat during the founding of Plumas County in 1854.

The 160 acre ranch was owned and operated by James Haun from 1856 to 1876.

The hotel is located at 355 Main Street and has been designated with a California Historical Landmark marker.

References
American Ranch and Hotel (No. 479 California Historical Landmark)
Fariss and Smith's History of Plumas County California 1882
Haun Collection
Plumas County Museum Newsletter

History of Plumas County, California
Buildings and structures in Plumas County, California
California Historical Landmarks